The Legitimacy Act 1959 was an Act of the Parliament of the United Kingdom. It was repealed by the Family Law Reform Act 1987.

Act
Prior to the passing of the Act, legitimacy was governed by the Legitimacy Act 1926. Under that act, the marriage of a child's parents after its birth did not legitimise it when one of the parents was married to a third person at the birth of the child. Although the Royal Commission on Marriage and Divorce recommended keeping this on the statute books by a vote of twelve to seven, Section 1 repealed this and allowed a child to be legitimised when his parents married, regardless of their past status. This was retroactive; if a child's parents were married when the Act came into force, the child was legitimised.

Section 2 legitimised the children born of void marriages, provided that both or either parents reasonably believed that the  marriages were valid and entered into in good faith (such as a marriage below the age of consent, where both wife and husband believed they are above it). Section 2(3) of the Legitimacy Act 1959 provided also that section 2 applied only where the father of the child was domiciliated in England.

References

Bibliography

United Kingdom Acts of Parliament 1959
Repealed United Kingdom Acts of Parliament
Legitimacy law
Family law in the United Kingdom